Doto sarsiae is a species of sea slug, a nudibranch, a marine gastropod mollusc in the family Dotidae.

Distribution
This species was first described from the Isle of Man, United Kingdom.

Description
This nudibranch is translucent white with dark red spots on the ceratal tubercles. The digestive gland inside the cerata is bright rose-red in colour. Its body size attains 12 mm.

EcologyDoto sarsiae feeds on the hydroid Coryne eximia, family Corynidae, formerly Sarsia eximia''.

References

External links
 

Dotidae
Gastropods described in 1992